Ahmed Tijan Janko (born 28 April 1995) is a Qatari beach volleyball player originally from Gambia.

In 2018, he alongside Cherif Younousse clinched the gold medal at the 2018 Asian Games in Palembang, Indonesia. The pair qualified for the 2020 Summer Olympics, where they won the bronze medal, the first ever medal for Qatar in beach volleyball.

References

External links
 
 
 
 

1995 births
Living people
Sportspeople from Banjul
Gambian emigrants
Immigrants to Qatar
Naturalised citizens of Qatar
Qatari beach volleyball players
Asian Games gold medalists for Qatar
Asian Games medalists in beach volleyball
Medalists at the 2018 Asian Games
Beach volleyball players at the 2018 Asian Games
Beach volleyball players at the 2020 Summer Olympics
Olympic bronze medalists for Qatar
Medalists at the 2020 Summer Olympics
Olympic medalists in beach volleyball